Thomas Anthony Makowski (born December 22, 1950) is a former pitcher in Major League Baseball who played for the Detroit Tigers in its 1975 season.

Makowski also played for the New York Mets in 1977 although he did not appear in an official regular season game. His only appearance with the club came in the exhibition Mayor's Trophy Game against the New York Yankees on June 23, getting credit for a win in a 6-4 decision at Shea Stadium.

External links

1950 births
Living people
Baseball players from Buffalo, New York
Junior college baseball players in the United States
Buffalo State Bengals baseball players
Detroit Tigers players
Evansville Triplets players
Lakeland Tigers players
Major League Baseball pitchers
Montgomery Rebels players
Tidewater Tides players
Toledo Mud Hens players